SLNS Parakramabahu (P351) was a Type 037 corvette class submarine chaser of the Sri Lanka Navy. The ship was named after King Parakramabahu I with warrior king of the ancient Sri Lankan Kingdom of Polonnaruwa. Purchased from the People's Liberation Army Navy, she served as the flagship of the fleet in the 1990s.

Operational history
Since joining the Sri Lankan fleet in 1996 with the objective of enhancing the blue water capability of the navy. She served as its flagship and was deployed for patrolling the coastal water around Sri Lanka. Due to this she was attached to the 7th Surveillance Command Squadron. During the Sri Lankan Civil War, Parakramabahu was involved in anti arms smuggling patrols and maritime surveillance. During the war she was involved in several sea battles with the LTTE Sea Tigers, including the 1997 battle of the coast of Mullaitivu. However, its operations were greatly limited due to frequent breakdowns and the requirement of an escort of crafts from the Fast Attack Flotilla, and found itself spending much time in port and in non operational areas.

Since early 2000, it was based at SLNS Dakshina in Galle, without going to sea due to breakdowns. It capsized and sank at its moorings at SLNS Dakshina when it was hit by the 2004 Indian Ocean tsunami. It was later re-floated by the Navy. It was damaged when the LTTE attacked SLNS Dakshina in 2006.

References

External links
Sri Lanka Navy

Ships of the Sri Lanka Navy
1996 ships